Bollathawa Grama Niladhari Division is a Grama Niladhari Division of the Seethawaka Divisional Secretariat of Colombo District of Western Province, Sri Lanka. It has Grama Niladhari Division Code 433.

Kumarimulla are located within, nearby or associated with Bollathawa.

Bollathawa is a surrounded by the Akaravita, Thawalgoda, Muruthagama, Nikawala, Ovitigama, Kumarimulla and Kanampella West Grama Niladhari Divisions.

Demographics

Ethnicity 
The Bollathawa Grama Niladhari Division has a Sinhalese majority (99.8%). In comparison, the Seethawaka Divisional Secretariat (which contains the Bollathawa Grama Niladhari Division) has a Sinhalese majority (88.2%)

Religion 
The Bollathawa Grama Niladhari Division has a Buddhist majority (98.6%). In comparison, the Seethawaka Divisional Secretariat (which contains the Bollathawa Grama Niladhari Division) has a Buddhist majority (81.5%)

References 

Grama Niladhari Divisions of Seethawaka Divisional Secretariat